The 1997–98 Prairie View A&M Panthers basketball team represents Prairie View A&M University during the 1997–98 NCAA Division I men's basketball season. The Panthers, led by 13th-year head coach Elwood Plummer, played their home games at the William Nicks Building in Prairie View, Texas as members of the Southwestern Athletic Conference. They finished the conference slate at 6–10, to finish in 6th place. In the SWAC Tournament, they defeated Jackson State, Alabama State, and Texas Southern to win the SWAC championship. The Panthers received an automatic bid to the NCAA tournament  the first appearance in program history  as the 16 seed in the Midwest region. Prairie View A&M fell to No. 1 seed Kansas in the opening round to finish the season with a 13–17 record.

Roster
Source:

Schedule and results
Source:

|-
!colspan=9 style=|Non-conference regular season

|-
!colspan=9 style=| SWAC regular season

|-
!colspan=9 style=| SWAC tournament

|-
!colspan=9 style=| NCAA tournament

References 

Prairie View A&M Panthers basketball seasons
Prairie View
Prairie View AandM basketball
Prairie View AandM basketball
Prairie View